Descemet's membrane (or the Descemet membrane) is the basement membrane that lies between the corneal proper substance, also called stroma, and the endothelial layer of the cornea. It is composed of different kinds of collagen (Type IV and VIII) than the stroma.  The endothelial layer is located at the posterior of the cornea.  Descemet's membrane, as the basement membrane for the endothelial layer, is secreted by the single layer of squamous epithelial cells that compose the endothelial layer of the cornea.

Structure
Its thickness ranges from 3 μm at birth to 8–10 μm in adults.

The corneal endothelium is a single layer of squamous cells covering the surface of the cornea that faces the anterior chamber.

Clinical significance

Significant damage to the membrane may require a corneal transplant.  Damage caused by the hereditary condition known as Fuchs dystrophy (q.v.)—where Descemet's membrane progressively fails and the cornea thickens and clouds because the exchange of nutrients/fluids between the cornea and the rest of the eye is interrupted—can be reversed by surgery.  The surgeon can scrape away the damaged Descemet membrane and insert/transplant a new membrane harvested from the eye of a donor. In the process most of the squamous cells of the donor membrane survive to dramatically and emphatically reverse the corneal deterioration (see DMEK surgery).

Descemet's membrane is also a site of copper deposition in patients with Wilson's disease or other liver diseases,  leading to formation of Kayser-Fleischer rings.

History
It is also known as the Posterior limiting elastic lamina, lamina elastica posterior, and membrane of Demours. It was named after French physician Jean Descemet (1732–1810).

See also
 Haab's striae
 Kayser–Fleischer ring
 Pierre Demours

References

Histology A text and atlas. Michael H.Ross and Wojciech Pawlina 5th Edition 2006

External links
 
 Diagram at dryeyezone.com

Human eye anatomy